Tabbanine Mosque also known as Sidi Jaafar Mosque, is an old mosque in the medina of Tunis in Tunisia. It was built by the hafsid Sultan Uthman.

Etymology
It got its name from the hay sellers who used to settle around it.

Localization
The mosque can be found in 21 Bab Lakouas Street in Bab Souika suburb.

History
It was built during the Hafsid era, following the orders of Sultan Uthman in 1487.

References

Mosques in Tunis